Joe Casey is an American comic book writer. Other people with the same name include:

 Joe Casey (singer) (born 1977), American musician
 Joe Casey (catcher) (1887–1966), baseball player
 Joe Casey (pitcher) (1900–1987), baseball player
 Joe Casey (boxer) (1937–2009), Irish boxer

See also
 Joseph Casey (disambiguation)